Joseph Frederick, better known as Billy Heath (1869 – after 1895), was an English footballer who played in the Football League for Wolverhampton Wanderers and Woolwich Arsenal. He is best known for having scored the first-ever penalty kick awarded in the Football League, doing it so in a match between Wolves and Accrington at Molineux Stadium on 14 September 1891, which Wolves won 5–0.

References

1869 births
Year of death missing
Footballers from Bristol
English footballers
Association football forwards
Arsenal F.C. players
Wolverhampton Wanderers F.C. players
Gravesend United F.C. players
English Football League players